Eddy Joseph (born on 5 June 1945) is a British sound engineer.

Early life and education
He was born in 1945, the son of a film producer Edward Joseph and was educated at Abingdon School from 1957 until 1962.

Career
Eddy began work with Baker and Todman Accountants before joining the film industry in 1967 and became a sound editor in 1981.

Awards
In 1982 he won the BAFTA award for Best Sound, for Pink Floyd's 'The Wall'. In 2006 he repeated the earlier success by winning the BAFTA award for Best Sound once again, this time for Casino Royale.

Nominations
He has received a further six BAFTA nominations
The Commitments in 1992
Evita in 1997 
Harry Potter and the Philosopher's Stone in 2002
Cold Mountain in 2004 
United 93 in 2007 
Quantum of Solace in 2009 

In addition he has also received 16 MPSE Motion Picture Sound Editors of America nominations.

See also
 List of Old Abingdonians

References

Living people
1945 births
British audio engineers
Best Sound BAFTA Award winners
People educated at Abingdon School